Afghanistan participated at the 2010 16th Asian Games in Guangzhou, China.

Medalist

Athletics

Men
Track and road events

Basketball

Men

Team

Mohammad Amiri
Sayed Ansari
Haroun Arafi
Yousof Etemadi
Qais Haider
Habib Kabir
Abdullah Karimi
Nafi Mashriqi
Mohammad Mojaddidi
Ali Noorzad
Mohammad Soratgar
Masseh Tahiry

Qualifying round

Group D

Boxing

Men

Cricket

Men

Team

Gulbudeen NaibMohammad ShahzadMohammad Sami AghaMohammad NabiKarim SadiqShafiqullah ShafaqMirwais AshrafShabir NooriShapoor ZadranAsghar AfghanSamiullah ShinwariNawroz MangalHamid HassanAftab Alam

Quarterfinals

Semifinals

Final

Cue Sports

Men

Golf

Men

Judo

Men

Women

Karate

Men

Women

Shooting

Men

Taekwondo

Men

Women

Weightlifting

Wrestling

Men
Freestyle

Greco-Roman

Wushu

Men
Daoshu\Gunshu

Nanquan\Nangun

Taijiquan\Taijijian

Sanshou

Women
Sanshou

Nations at the 2010 Asian Games
2010
Asian Games